USS Lassen (DDG-82) is an Arleigh Burke-class guided missile destroyer in the United States Navy. She is named for Medal of Honor recipient Commander Clyde Everett Lassen. This ship is the 32nd destroyer of her class. Lassen was the 14th ship of this class to be built by Ingalls Shipbuilding at Pascagoula, Mississippi, and construction began on 24 August 1998. She was launched and christened on 16 October 1999. On 21 April 2001, she was commissioned at the Florida Aquarium Pier in Tampa, Florida.

Service history 
She was homeported in San Diego until she shifted homeport to Yokosuka Naval Base in Yokosuka, Japan in August 2005.

On 15 February 2009 at 12:25 pm, Lassen collided with a Japanese 14-ton pleasure boat in Yokosuka harbor. On 23 March 2009 the Japan Coast Guard filed a case against both the destroyer's and the fishing boat's captains with local prosecutors for professional negligence that endangered traffic.

On 1 July 2009, Fox News Channel reported that Lassen was tracking the North Korean ship Kang Nam 1, suspected of carrying contraband.

On 27 October 2015 Lassen navigated within 12 nautical miles of Subi Reef, one of seven artificial islands built up by China in the Spratly Islands (commonly called the "Great Wall of Sand") in the past year, the first in a planned series of Freedom of navigation operations (also referred to as FONOPs). This is the first time since 2012 that the US has directly challenged China's claims of the island's territorial limit.

In January 2016, she moved to Naval Station Mayport in Mayport, Florida. According to the Standard Navy Distribution List, March 2016, at that time she was assigned to the new Naval Surface Squadron 14.

Awards
 Arleigh Burke Fleet Trophy - (2019)

Coat of arms

Shield 
The shield has background of blue with a medium blue chevron in the middle. Above the chevron is a sea lion, below is a compass rose. The traditional Navy colors were chosen for the shield because dark blue and gold represents the sea and excellence respectively. The AEGIS shield displays the ships modern warfare systems. The blue chevron is a symbol of the ships coastal service in the Vietnam War as well as the prow of the ship due to its mission as an ammunition ship. The chevron is also designed like the ribbon of the Medal of Honor awarded to Lieutenant Lassen for his heroism in his rescue of two aviators. The sea lion represents strength and courage which Lieutenant Lassen continuously displayed. The compass rose symbolizes the landing lights of the helicopter which he used to rescue the aviators.

Crest 
The crest consists of a gold trident surrounded by red lightning bolts over palm fronds. The trident symbolizes sea prowess while the three tines represent the battle stars earned during World War II in the Pacific while denoting the multi-threat warfare systems of the USS Lassen. The red lightning bolts refer to the strike capability and mission as an ammunition ship, rearming many fleets during war.

Motto 
The motto is written on a scroll of blue that has a gold reverse side. The ships motto is "From Courage Life". The motto is a reference to both the honorable feats of Lieutenant Lassen and the Medal of Honor he received.

Seal 
The coat of arms in full color as in the blazon, upon a white background enclosed within a dark blue oval border edged on the outside with a gold rope and bearing the inscription "USS Lassen" at the top and "DDG 82" in the base all gold.

References

External links

 USS Lassen Official Homepage
 USS Lassen's History on US Carriers
 

Arleigh Burke-class destroyers
Ships built in Pascagoula, Mississippi
1999 ships